The GWR 439 Class, nicknamed the Bicycle Class because of its unusual appearance, was a series of six  mixed-traffic engines designed by Joseph Armstrong for the Great Western Railway, and built at Swindon Works in 1868. The "Bicycles" worked at Northern Division sheds, running between Wolverhampton and Chester.

Design
Numbered in the series 439–444, the running plate of these inside-framed locomotives was raised, without splashers, above each of the large driving wheels, rather giving the impression of bicycle wheels and mudguards.

Rebuilding
Most of the class was renewed at Wolverhampton railway works under George Armstrong in 1885 and 1886; the renewals were more conventional in appearance, with large splashers, but the class's nickname stuck. At first the renewals also ran on the same routes as their predecessors, though later some were transferred further south.

References

Sources

0439
2-4-0 locomotives
Railway locomotives introduced in 1868